Faiza Ismailova (born 20 July 2002) is a Kazakhstani footballer who plays as a midfielder for the Kazakhstan women's national team.

International career
Ismailova capped for Kazakhstan at senior level during the UEFA Women's Euro 2022 qualifying.

References

2002 births
Living people
Kazakhstani women's footballers
Women's association football midfielders
Kazakhstan women's international footballers